The Last Safari is a 1967 British adventure film directed by Henry Hathaway. It stars Kaz Garas and Stewart Granger. It was based on the 1962 novel, Gilligan's Last Elephant by Gerald Hanley.

Plot
Miles Gilchrist (Stewart Granger) is a big game hunter in Africa. He goes on a safari to shoot an elephant who killed his friend. He is accompanied by Casey (Kaz Garas), an American millionaire intrigued by Gilchrist's story, and Grant (Gabriella Licudi), Casey's half-caste girlfriend.

Miles feels he is to blame for his friend's death, and has to redeem himself. He sees hunter Alec Beaumont (Liam Redmond) refusing to eat with Grant, an indication of how life is different in Africa. Casey and Miles help to save a group of white hunters ambushed in a Masai village.

Later, Miles  and Casey are nearly killed by a herd of charging elephants, led by a rogue elephant. Casey refuses to fire knowing Miles also won't shoot, but is not afraid. Casey bids Miles farewell and leaves Africa and Grant, who stays behind in the hopes of finding a new benefactor.

Cast

 Kaz Garas as Casey
 Stewart Granger as Miles Gilchrist
 Gabriella Licudi as Grant
 Johnny Sekka as Jama
 Liam Redmond as Alex Beaumont
 Eugene Deckers as Refugee leader
 David Munya as Chongu
 John De Villiers as Rich
 Wilfred Moore as Game warden
 Jean Parnell as Mrs. Beaumont
 Bill Grant as Commissioner
 John Sutton as Harry
 Kipkoske as Gavai
 Labina as Village chief

Production
The Last Safari was the first of a four-picture deal between Hathaway and Paramount. Kaz Garas was an actor under contract to Hal Wallis.

The film involved five weeks location shooting in Kenya. The corporate jet used in the film was a Learjet 23 leased from Busy Bee. It was painted in zebra stripes for use in the film.

Reception
The Los Angeles Times called The Last Safari, "... a most satisfying film of its kind".

Stewart Granger later called this "my last real film... the worst film ever made in Africa!"

References

Notes

Bibliography

 MacFarlane, Brian. An Autobiography of British Cinema. London: Methuen, 1997. .

External links

 

1967 films
1967 adventure films
British adventure films
1960s English-language films
Films based on British novels
Films directed by Henry Hathaway
Films about hunters
Films set in Africa
Films shot in Kenya
Paramount Pictures films
Films with screenplays by John Gay (screenwriter)
Films scored by John Dankworth
1960s British films